Charneca de Caparica e Sobreda is a civil parish in the municipality of Almada, Portugal. It was formed in 2013 by the merger of the former parishes Charneca de Caparica and Sobreda. The population in 2011 was 44,929, in an area of 29.31 km2.

References

Parishes of Almada